Dabheji Railway Station is located at Dhabeji, near Karachi, Pakistan.

 List of railway stations in Pakistan
 Pakistan Railways

References

External links

Railway stations in Sujawal District
Railway stations on Karachi Circular Railway
Railway stations on Karachi–Peshawar Line (ML 1)